"Bomb" is the fourth episode of British sitcom The Young Ones. It was written by Ben Elton, Rik Mayall and Lise Mayer, and directed by Paul Jackson. It was first aired on BBC2 on 30 November 1982. The episode notably satirises the then-current anxieties of a potential nuclear war, and features references to the Protect and Survive pamphlets intended to be distributed in the UK in the event of such a conflict.

Plot
The episode opens with footage of a US Air Force B-1 Lancer bomber dropping a payload, revealed to be a huge red atom bomb that lands into the quartet's house. Neil fails to notice the real reason for an enormous hole in the ceiling when he gets out of bed to do the breakfast, assuming that one of his flatmates had put it there somehow. Eventually Vyvyan points out that the atom bomb is perched against the refrigerator. The initial panic is diverted by the arrival of a sadistic television licence officer who wants blood, but soon the quartet returns to the emergency at hand.

Mike tries negotiating with Libya to make a profit out of the bomb while Rick uses the bomb in attempts to make threats to the British government (his efforts at sending a threatening telegram through the Post Office fail when it turns out he has mistakenly walked into the DHSS). Neil, ever the pragmatist, sets out his personal survival plan ("I'm going to consult the incredibly helpful [Protect and Survive] manual!") and Vyvyan tries to speed up the detonation procedure. The final tick of the clock prior to the "explosion" proves to be a little disappointing, with the bomb hatching like an egg and a small aeroplane appearing out of the bomb, flying out of the room, and circling outside the house (thus implying the bomb was merely an "egg" of the bomber).

Characters
As with all episodes of The Young Ones, the main four characters were student housemates Mike (Christopher Ryan), Vyvyan (Adrian Edmondson), Rick (Rik Mayall) and Neil (Nigel Planer). Alexei Sayle starred as Reggie Balowski, a wisecracking used car dealer and son of the students' landlord, Jerzei. Roger Sloman appeared as the television license officer named "Right Bleedin' Bastard."

Reception
The episode features a performance from Dexys Midnight Runners performing a cover of Van Morrison's "Jackie Wilson Said (I'm in Heaven When You Smile)".

A cut-away sketch, "Dicky and Dino" (played by Mayall and Planer) parodies The Rat Pack, primarily their family-friendly image as depicted in television specials (and the inherent contrast this provides with their supposed involvement with organised crime).

References

The Young Ones episodes
1982 British television episodes
Television shows written by Ben Elton
Television episodes about nuclear war and weapons